Admiral Sir Guy Herbrand Edward Russell,  (14 April 1898 – 25 September 1977) was a senior Royal Navy officer. He served as Commander-in-Chief, Far East Fleet from 1951 to 1953 during the Korean War, Second Sea Lord from 1953 to 1955, and Commandant of the Imperial Defence College from 1956 until his retirement in 1958.

Early life
Born on 14 April 1899 in St George Hanover Square, London, Russell was the second son of Oliver Russell, 2nd Baron Ampthill, and his wife Margaret. Educated at Stonehouse School, Russell entered the Royal Navy in 1911 and attended the Royal Naval College, Osborne and Dartmouth.

Naval career
During the First World War, Russell went to sea as a midshipman aboard , which supported the Dardanelles landings. He would later serve aboard  during the Battle of Jutland, and was mentioned in despatches for his war service.

Russell saw service on a variety of ships, destroyers, cruisers, battleships, shore training establishments, and on the staff of the Commander-in-Chief Mediterranean, before his relatively early promotion to commander in 1931. This well-rounded record was combined with a reputation for adaptiveness and innovation. Russell continued to excel in this position, and was promoted to captain in 1936. After further studies at the Imperial Defence College, Russell became Assistant Director of Plans in 1938.

On the outbreak of the Second World War, Russell first commanded the net layer , and then the cruiser . In late 1941, Russell became naval liaison officer to the Governor of Gibraltar, Viscount Gort, and subsequently followed Gort to Malta as his chief of staff. After the relief of the island by Operation Stone Age, Russell would move on to command  and then , flagship of the Home Fleet. It was under his command that Duke of York sank the Scharnhorst at the Battle of North Cape, and he was awarded the Distinguished Service Order as a result, having already been twice mentioned in despatches during the war. A year later, he was appointed to a staff position, naval assistant to the Second Sea Lord, and promoted rear admiral in 1945. He was made a Commander of the Order of the British Empire in 1943.

Russell returned to the Imperial Defence College from 1946 until 1948, was appointed a Companion of the Order of the Bath that year, and then spent a year commanding the 2nd Cruiser Squadron of Home Fleet, earning the respect of the then Commander-in-Chief, Sir Rhoderick McGrigor. With the reserves until 1951, he was then appointed Commander-in-Chief, Far East Fleet and made a Knight Commander of the Order of the Bath. He served on that station until 1953, taking part in the Korean War, and was promoted admiral in 1952. Returning from the Far East, he was made a Knight Grand Cross of the Order of the British Empire and served as Second Sea Lord and Chief of Naval Personnel until 1955. Russell's acute intelligence and bluff but kindly manner, combined with his broad experience, served him well in this position. He was Commandant of the Imperial Defence College from 1956 until his retirement in 1958.

Later life
After retiring, Russell devoted himself to education and the training of young people, at Wellington College, Cranleigh School, Gordon Boys' School, and Radley College. An excellent oarsman (like his father), avid golfer and good shot, he died at his home in Wisborough Green in 1977.

Family
He married (Helen) Elizabeth Blades, daughter of Rowland Blades, 1st Baron Ebbisham, in 1939. They had two sons and a daughter:
 Dr. James Rowland Russell (28 March 1940 – 2 March 2015) married and left children. 
 Oliver Henry Russell (b. 7 May 1942) married to Clare Macpherson-Grant, cookbook author, and has children. The elder son has assumed his mother's family name. 
 Margaret Elizabeth Russell (b. 11 October 1945) married and has children.

References

|-

|-

|-

1898 births
1977 deaths
Graduates of Britannia Royal Naval College
Graduates of the Royal College of Defence Studies
Companions of the Distinguished Service Order
Graduates of the Royal Naval College, Greenwich
Knights Commander of the Order of the Bath
Knights Grand Cross of the Order of the British Empire
Lords of the Admiralty
Royal Navy admirals of World War II
Royal Navy personnel of the Korean War
Royal Navy officers of World War I
Younger sons of barons
People educated at the Royal Naval College, Osborne
People from Wisborough Green
Military personnel from London